The National Centre for Sustainable Coastal Management  (NCSCM), Chennai is a research institute under the Ministry of Environment, Forest and Climate Change (MoEF&CC), Government of India with a vision to manage the Indian coast in a sustainable manner. The newly constructed building of NCSCM inaugurated by Honourable Minister Dr. Harsh Vardhan on 15 July 2017.

References

External links
 Welcome to NCSCM
 Home
 Sicommief.in
 Home - Anna University

Scientific organizations established in 2011
2011 establishments in Tamil Nadu
Research institutes in Chennai